Growth may refer to:

Biology
Auxology, the study of all aspects of human physical growth
Bacterial growth
Cell growth
Growth hormone, a peptide hormone that stimulates growth
Human development (biology)
Plant growth
Secondary growth, growth that thickens woody plants
A tumor or other such neoplasm

Economics
 Economic growth, the increase in the inflation-adjusted market value of the goods and services
 Growth investing, a style of investment strategy focused on capital appreciation

Mathematics
 Exponential growth, also called geometric growth
 Hyperbolic growth
 Linear growth, refers to two distinct but related notions
 Logistic growth, characterized as an S curve

Social science
 Developmental psychology
 Erikson's stages of psychosocial development
 Human development (humanity)
 Personal development
 Population growth

Other uses
 Growth (film), a 2010 American horror film
 Izaugsme (Growth), a Latvian political party
 Grown (album), by 2PM

See also

 Grow (disambiguation)
 Growth curve (disambiguation)
 Growth impairment (disambiguation)
 Growth industry (disambiguation)
 Growth model (disambiguation)
 Growth rate (disambiguation)
 Growth regulator (disambiguation)